In Our Own Way is a 2013 documentary written, directed and produced by Italian director , telling a story of five women and their relationship with men. The project received Special Mention Award at the Mumbai Women's International Film Festival 2013. Five women tell their stories of relationships with a man – uncensored, unvarnished they reveal deep and intimate truths of love's many facets. Five female perspectives, five different ways of loving a man: dreamed love, suffered love, lost love, denied love and realized love.

Festivals & Awards
 Special Mention Award at Mumbai Women's International Film Festival 2013
 Official Selection at Mumbai Women's International Film Festival 2013
 Official Selection at Sciacca Film Festival 2013
 Official Selection at Skyline Indie Film Festival 2013

References

External links

Italian documentary films
2013 films